The Gecarcinucidae are a family of true freshwater crabs. The family Parathelphusidae is now demoted to the rank of subfamily, as the Parathelphusinae, within the Gecarcinucidae.  "Family" Parathelphusidae is now considered as a junior synonym.

Taxonomy 
The Gecarcinucidae are thought to have originated in the Indian subcontinent when it was an island continent in the Paleogene, despite not being of ancient Gondwanan origins themselves (unlike other lineages that are thought to have originated in Insular India). Divergence estimates indicate that the Gecarcinucidae originate from Southeast Asian ancestors that dispersed to India during the middle Eocene, before India collided with Asia. This is thought to have occurred due to India drifting close enough to Southeast Asia to allow for biotic exchange between both regions. As the Gecarcinucidae are a freshwater group that could not disperse via marine habitats, this indicates that temporary land bridges may have formed in the Eocene between India and Southeast Asia, allowing for the dispersal of freshwater organisms to India while it was still isolated. Following the India-Asia collision, the Gecarcinucidae dispersed back into mainland Asia.

The Gecarcinucidae are thought to be the sister group to the Potamoidea (the superfamily comprising the Potamidae and Potamonautidae).

Genera

Adeleana Bott, 1969
Arachnothelphusa Ng, 1991
Austrothelphusa Bott, 1969
Bakousa Ng, 1995
Balssiathelphusa Bott, 1969
Baratha Bahir & Yeo, 2007
Barytelphusa Alcock, 1909
Ceylonthelphusa Bott, 1969
Clinothelphusa Ng & Tay, 2001
Coccusa S. H. Tan & Ng, 1998
Currothelphusa Ng, 1990
Cylindrotelphusa Alcock, 1909
Esanthelphusa Naiyanetr, 1994
Gecarcinucus Milne Edwards, 1844
Geelvinkia Bott, 1974
Geithusa Ng, 1989
Ghatiana Pati & Sharma, 2014
Globitelphusa Alcock, 1909
Gubernatoriana Bott, 1970
Guinothusa Yeo & Ng, 2010
Heterothelphusa Ng & Lim, 1986
Holthuisana Bott, 1969
Inglethelphusa Bott, 1970
Irmengardia Bott, 1969
Kani Kumar, Raj & Ng, 2017
Lamella Bahir & Yeo, 2007
Lepidopthelphusa Colosi, 1920
Liotelphusa Alcock, 1909
Mahatha Ng & Tay, 2001
Mainitia Bott, 1969
Maydelliathelphusa Bott, 1969
Mekhongthelphusa Naiyanetr, 1985
Migmathelphusa O. K. S. Chia & Ng, 2006
Nautilothelphusa Balss, 1933
Niasathelphusa Ng, 1991
Oziotelphusa Muller, 1887
Parathelphusa H. Milne Edwards, 1853
Pastilla Ng & Tay, 2001
Perbrinckia Bott, 1969
Perithelphusa Man, 1899
Phricotelphusa Alcock, 1909
Pilarta Bahir & Yeo, 2007
Rouxana Bott, 1969
Salangathelphusa Bott, 1968
Sartoriana Bott, 1969
Sayamia Naiyanetr, 1994
Sendleria Bott, 1969
Siamthelphusa Bott, 1968
Snaha Bahir & Yeo, 2007
Sodhiana Yeo & Ng, 2012
Somanniathelphusa Bott, 1968
Spiralothelphusa Bott, 1968
Stygothelphusa Ng, 1989
Sundathelphusa Bott, 1969
Syntripsa O. K. S. Chia & Ng, 2006
Terrathelphusa Ng, 1989
Thaksinthelphusa Ng & Naiyanetr, 1993
Thelphusula Bott, 1969
Torhusa Ng, 1997
Travancoriana Bott, 1969
Vanni Bahir & Yeo, 2007
Vela Bahir & Yeo, 2007

References

 
Taxa named by Mary J. Rathbun
Decapod families